Valentin Filippovich Knysh (20 September 1937 – 4 March 2022) was a Russian politician. A member of the Communist Party of the Russian Federation, he served in the State Duma from 1995 to 2003. 

Knysh died on 4 March 2022, at the age of 84.

References

1937 births
2022 deaths
20th-century Russian politicians
21st-century Russian politicians
Second convocation members of the State Duma (Russian Federation)
Third convocation members of the State Duma (Russian Federation)
Communist Party of the Russian Federation members
People from Komsomolsk-on-Amur